Myjai Sanders (born July 12, 1998) is an American football outside linebacker for the Arizona Cardinals of the National Football League (NFL). He played college football at Cincinnati and was drafted by the Cardinals in the third round of the 2022 NFL Draft.

Early life and high school
Sanders grew up in Jacksonville, Florida and attended William M. Raines High School before transferring to Camden County High School in Kingsland, Georgia before his junior year. He was named to the Coastal Georgia All-Area team by The Brunswick News after recording 39 tackles, three sacks and seven quarterback hurries as a senior. Sanders committed to play college football at Cincinnati over offers from Ole Miss, Mississippi State, Washington State, UCF.

College career
Sanders played in ten games with seven tackles as a reserve in his freshman season. He was named a starter as a sophomore and finished the season with 40 tackles with seven tackles for loss and four sacks. Sanders was a named a semifinalist for the Chuck Bednarik Award as a junior. He was named the American Athletic Conference Defensive Player of the Week after recording six tackles with 1.5 sacks in a 49–10 win over Memphis.

Professional career

Sanders was selected in the third round (100th overall) by the Arizona Cardinals in the 2022 NFL Draft.

References

External links
 Arizona Cardinals bio
Cincinnati Bearcats bio

1998 births
Living people
American football defensive ends
Arizona Cardinals players
Cincinnati Bearcats football players
Players of American football from Jacksonville, Florida
African-American players of American football
21st-century African-American people